Didymocheliidae is a family of crustaceans belonging to the order Amphipoda.

Genera:
 Aidamochelia Thomas & Watling, 2012
 Apodidymochelia Thurston, 1997
 Didymochelia Barnard, 1931

References

Amphipoda